WDBQ (1490 kHz) is an AM radio station broadcasting a talk radio format. Located in Dubuque, Iowa, United States, the station is currently owned by Townsquare Media and licensed to Townsquare License, LLC.

History
Station WKBB signed on in 1925 from Joliet, Illinois. In 1931, the station's ownership wanted to move WKBB to Dubuque as it did not have any radio stations. However, the complicated licensing quota system put into place by the Davis Amendment to the Radio Act of 1927 limited the number of stations that could be licensed to one state. At the time, both Iowa and Illinois were at their quota, and the Federal Radio Commission was forced to deny any relocations or new stations. WKBB was required to stay in state, and its application to move to East Dubuque, Illinois was granted in 1932 over the objections of the Dubuque Telegraph Herald, which desired to build its own station but could not due to the quota. The Davis Amendment was repealed in 1936; WKBB applied to move to Dubuque proper in the next year.

WDBQ is one of six call signs beginning with a W still in use in Iowa, where stations are normally assigned call signs beginning with K. Although the five other call signs were granted before the boundary between K and W call signs moved to the Mississippi River in 1923, WKBB it was allowed to keep its W callsign when it moved, and again when it changed to WDBQ in 1952 – an exception also granted to WSUI and WMT elsewhere in Iowa.

As of September 2009, WDBQ's weekday programming includes Michael Smerconish, Laura Ingraham, Rush Limbaugh, Sean Hannity and Fred Thompson. Sports on WDBQ includes the Chicago Cubs, Chicago Bulls, and Chicago Bears as well as Loras College football and basketball, high school sports, The Indy Racing League and ESPN Radio. Kim Komando's technology advice show can be heard Saturday mornings.

On August 30, 2013, a deal was announced in which Cumulus Media would swap its stations in Dubuque (including WDBQ) and Poughkeepsie, New York to Townsquare Media in exchange for Peak Broadcasting's Fresno, California stations. The deal was part of Cumulus' acquisition of Dial Global; Townsquare, Peak, and Dial Global were all controlled by Oaktree Capital Management. The transaction was consummated effective November 14, 2013.

References

External links
WDBQ NewsTalk 1490AM

µ
News and talk radio stations in the United States
Mass media in Dubuque, Iowa
CBS Sports Radio stations
Townsquare Media radio stations